Harry Colby Smith (August 21, 1869 – May 14, 1953) was a Canadian politician. He served in the Legislative Assembly of New Brunswick as a member of the Progressive Conservative Party from 1926 to 1939. His father, Albert Colby Smith, along with his son, Alphonso C. Smith also served in the Legislative Assembly.

References

1869 births
1953 deaths
20th-century Canadian politicians
Progressive Conservative Party of New Brunswick MLAs